Noor Ophthalmology Complex is a hospital network in Iran. The organization was founded in 1993 by Hassan Hashemi and owns facilities in Tehran and Karaj. The network established the first ophthalmology subspecialty clinic in Iran.

List of facilities 
 Noor Eye Hospital
 Noor Ophthalmology Research Center
 Alborz Noor Eye Clinic
 Motahari Eye Clinic
 Noor Excimer Laser Clinic

References

External links 
 

Hospital networks
Organizations established in 1993
Private hospitals in Iran